This is a list of Albania national football team results from 2020 to 2029.

Fixtures and results

2020

2021

2022

2023
Forthcoming fixtures
The following matches are scheduled:

Notes and references

Notes

References

External links
 
Albania at RSSSF

2020s
2019–20 in Albanian football
2020–21 in Albanian football